The Pacific National League was a minor league baseball league that played from 1903 to 1905. The league evolved from its predecessor, the Pacific Northwest League and was a competitor of the newly formed Pacific Coast League. The league began play in 1903 as a Class A level league, the highest level of minor leagues in the era, before becoming a Class B level league in 1904 and 1905. Member teams were based in California, Idaho, Oregon, Montana, Utah and Washington.

History
In 1903, the Pacific Northwest League changed its name to become the Pacific National League. This was a result of the independent California League deciding to expand north into Seattle and Portland, and changing its name to the Pacific Coast League as a result. The Pacific Northwest League decided to oppose the move by placing franchises of its own in Los Angeles and San Francisco (San Francisco Pirates), with William Henry Lucas continuing as president of the newly named league.

The Class A level Pacific National League began play on April 14, 1903, with eight teams. The league had teams based in Seattle, Los Angeles, Portland and San Francisco, which all also had teams in the Pacific Coast League; these were complemented by teams in the smaller cities of Butte, Helena, Spokane and Tacoma. Travel would prove to be a challenge and on July 1,1903, the Portland franchise was replaced by a new team in Salt Lake City. On August 15, Helena left the league, and was soon followed by Tacoma, Los Angeles and San Francisco, as the remaining four teams finished out the season.

With four cities left in 1904, the league was downgraded to Class B level league, with teams based in Boise, Butte, Salt Lake City and Spokane. In 1905, Ogden replaced Butte as the league remained a four–team league. The 1905 Pacific National League permanently folded on June 20, 1905, when the Salt Lake City Fruit Pickers disbanded. The league was expelled from the National Association on February 20, 1906 and never reformed.

Pacific National League member teams

Standings & statistics
1903 Pacific National League
schedule
 Portland (21–42) moved to Salt Lake City July 2; Tacoma and Helena disbanded August 16; Los Angeles and San Francisco disbanded August 21. 

1904 Pacific National League
schedule
 
 
1905 Pacific National League
schedule
 The league disbanded June 20 when Salt Lake City withdrew.

References

Defunct minor baseball leagues in the United States
Sports leagues established in 1903
Sports leagues disestablished in 1905
Baseball leagues in California
Baseball leagues in Idaho
Baseball leagues in Oregon
Baseball leagues in Montana
Baseball leagues in Washington (state)
Baseball leagues in Utah

External links
 Sanborn map of Spokane showing Natatorium Park, as it was in 1910
 Sanborn map of Tacoma showing the ballpark, as it was in 1896
 Sanborn map of Tacoma showing another ballpark, as it was in 1950